Ildefonso Lee (born 12 March 1936) is a Panamanian weightlifter. He competed at the 1964 Summer Olympics, the 1968 Summer Olympics and the 1972 Summer Olympics.

References

1936 births
Living people
Panamanian male weightlifters
Olympic weightlifters of Panama
Weightlifters at the 1964 Summer Olympics
Weightlifters at the 1968 Summer Olympics
Weightlifters at the 1972 Summer Olympics
Sportspeople from Panama City
Pan American Games medalists in weightlifting
Pan American Games gold medalists for Panama
Pan American Games silver medalists for Panama
Pan American Games bronze medalists for Panama
Weightlifters at the 1963 Pan American Games
Weightlifters at the 1967 Pan American Games
Weightlifters at the 1971 Pan American Games
20th-century Panamanian people
21st-century Panamanian people